Le Roy Engloys is a song found in the Bayeux Manuscript, a collection of more than a hundred songs compiled at the start of the 16th century AD by Charles III de Bourbon and written at the end of the 15th century AD, some dozens of years after the end of the Hundred Years' War.

The song contains numerous historical errors due to the fact that its composition took place close to half a century after the events it recounts. The English King Henry V is said to have died in Saint-Fiacre in Brie, while in reality he died in Vincennes. The "Captain Prégent" is Prigent VII de Coëtivy, one of the victors, along with Jean de Clermont, of the Battle of Formigny, on 18 April 1450 (3500 dead on the English side, 500 on the French side). The Middle French word used for "tails", "couez", bears a resemblance to the word "couard", meaning "coward". The word "Godon" was a French ethnic slur for English people, which may be the result of a corruption of "God-damn".

Lyrics

References 

Hundred Years' War
French songs